P.R.C. is the People's Republic of China, the formal name of China.

PRC may also refer to:

Organizations

Political
 Communist Refoundation Party, (Partito della Rifondazione Comunista), Italy
 Regionalist Party of Cantabria
 Popular Resistance Committees, Palestinian militant organizations
 People's Redemption Council, Liberian early 1980s military regime
 Pasadena Republican Club
 People's Republic of the Congo, former country in Africa (until 1992)
 Republic of the Congo, successor of the People's Republic of the Congo, ongoing UNDP code

Other organizations
 Pew Research Center
Philippine Red Cross

 Postal Regulatory Commission, an independent regulatory agency in the US
 Presbyterian Reformed Church (Australia)
 Producers Releasing Corporation, Hollywood film studio 1939–1947
 Professional Regulation Commission, Philippines
 Protestant Reformed Churches in America

Science and technology

Biology
 Phase response curve, graph of biological responses to light or other time cues
 Photosynthetic reaction centre, the molecular unit responsible for absorbing light in photosynthesis
 Progesterone receptor C, one of the isoforms of the progesterone receptor

Computing and telecommunication
 PRC (Palm OS), computer code database file format, also used in e-books as Mobipocket MOBI and Kindle AZW
 PRC (file format), a way to store 3D data in a PDF file
 Primary reference clock, for synchronization in telecommunications

LCD display
 Panel Response Correction (PRC)

Other uses in science and technology
 Passive radiative cooling, a solar radiation management strategy to reverse global warming.
 Practical reserve capacity, for traffic at a traffic signal junction
 Prestressed reinforced concrete, a prestressed concrete
 Precast reinforced concrete

Other uses
 Ernest A. Love Field (IATA airport code), an airport near Prescott, Arizona, US
 Premier's Reading Challenge, a reading challenge for school students in parts of Australia
 Pregnancy Resource Center, a nonprofit organization offering pregnant women resources and counseling for alternatives to abortion
 Premier Coach, parent of Vermont Translines, American bus company

See also
 Peach PRC, an Australian singer, songwriter, and internet personality
 Polycomb repressive complex 2 or PRC2, a protein
 AN/PRC, for "Army/Navy, Portable, Radio, Communication", e.g. AN/PRC-77 Portable Transceiver